Otomar Bureš (born 14 December 1906, date of death unknown) was a Czech equestrian. He competed in two events at the 1936 Summer Olympics.

References

1906 births
Year of death missing
Czech male equestrians
Olympic equestrians of Czechoslovakia
Equestrians at the 1936 Summer Olympics
Sportspeople from Prague